SIM.JS is an event-based discrete-event simulation library based on standard
JavaScript. The library has been written in order to enable simulation within standard browsers by utilizing web technology.

SIM.JS supports entities, resources (Facility, Buffers and Stores), communication (via Timers, Events and Messages) and statistics 
(with Data Series, Time Series and Population statistics).

The SIM.JS distribution contains tutorials, in-depth documentation, and a large
number of examples.

SIM.JS is released as open source software under the LGPL license. The first version was released in January 2011.

Example 

There are several examples bundled with the library download. Trafficlight simulation is a standard simulation problem, which may be simulated as within this example:

External links 
 Analysis of the potential role of open source discrete event simulation software in the manufacturing sector issued by Proceedings of the Operational Research Society Simulation Workshop 2012 comparing SIM.JS among other open source simulation solutions
 Bachelor thesis on Web-Based Single-Player Project Simulation Game reviewing SIM.JS
 Interactive Model-Centric Systems Engineering report by Systems Engineering Research Center managed by Stevens Institute of Technology mentioning SIM.JS
 Modeling and Simulation of Tape Libraries for Hierarchical Storage Management Systems, Master Thesis reviewing DES frameworks, including SIM.JS

Cross-platform software
Free science software
Simulation programming languages